Taxell is a surname. Notable people with the surname include:

 Christoffer Taxell (born 1948), Finland Swedish politician and business leader
 Lars Erik Taxell (1913–2013), Finnish legal scholar and politician
 Sophie Taxell (1911–1986), Finnish painter